Heath Lamberts,  (December 15, 1941 – February 22, 2005) was a Canadian actor.

He was born James Lancaster in Toronto, Ontario, where, as a boy, he won singing contests at school, allowing him to perform with Toronto's Opera Festival Association. He pursued the arts as a career, changing his name to Heath Lamberts, and in 1963 graduated from the National Theatre School of Canada in Montreal. He worked extensively in theatres across Canada, especially at the Shaw Festival and the Stratford Festival. He also studied mime in Paris, France, at Le Coq d'Or. On Broadway his longest role was in the original cast of Beauty and the Beast on Broadway as Cogsworth. He had roles in dozens of television movies and shows and played numerous roles in Pittsburgh theatre.

Although most prominently a stage actor, he also had some supporting film and television roles, including in the films A Great Big Thing and Sam & Me.

He was inducted as a Member of the Order of Canada in 1987.

Lamberts died in Pittsburgh, Pennsylvania, US, on February 22, 2005, from cancer.

References

External links
 

1941 births
2005 deaths
Canadian male stage actors
Members of the Order of Canada
Male actors from Pittsburgh
Deaths from cancer in Pennsylvania
National Theatre School of Canada alumni
Dora Mavor Moore Award winners
Male actors from Toronto
Canadian male film actors
Canadian male television actors
20th-century Canadian male actors
21st-century Canadian male actors